The International Civil Rights Center & Museum (ICRCM) is located in Greensboro, North Carolina, United States. Its building formerly housed the Woolworth's, the site of a non-violent protest in the civil rights movement. Four students from North Carolina Agricultural and Technical State University (NC A&T) started the Greensboro sit-ins at a "whites only" lunch counter on February 1, 1960. The four students were Franklin McCain, Joseph McNeil, Ezell Blair Jr. (now Jibreel Khazan), and David Richmond. The next day there were twenty students. The aim of the museum's founders is to ensure that history remembers the actions of the A&T Four, those who joined them in the daily Woolworth's sit-ins, and others around the country who took part in sit-ins and in the civil rights movement. The Museum is currently supported by earned admissions and Museum Store revenues.  The project also receives donations from private donors as a means of continuing its operations. The museum was founded in 1993 and officially opened its doors fifty years to the day after the sit-in movements in Greensboro NC.

Saving the building
In 1993, the Woolworth's downtown Greensboro store, which had been open since 1939, closed, and the company announced plans to tear down the building. Greensboro radio station 102 JAMZ (WJMH), began a petition drive to save the location. Morning radio personality Dr. Michael Lynn broadcast in front of the closed store day and night to save the historic building. Eighteen thousand signatures were gathered on a petition. Rev. Jesse Jackson Jr. visited the location, endorsed the effort, and joined the live broadcast. After three days, the F. W. Woolworth company announced an agreement to maintain the location while financing could be arranged to buy the store. (The Woolworth chain went out of business in 1997, a few years later; the company owning the chain became Venator and is now named Foot Locker.)

County Commissioner Melvin "Skip" Alston and City Councilman Earl Jones proposed buying the site and turning it into a museum. The two founded Sit-in Movement, Inc., a nonprofit organization dedicated to realizing this dream. The group succeeded in purchasing and renovating the property.

In 2001, Sit-in Movement Inc. and NC A&T announced a partnership to facilitate the museum's becoming a reality.

Financial difficulties

The museum project suffered financial difficulties for a number of years, despite millions of dollars in donations. These included more than $1 million from the State of North Carolina, a contribution from the Bryan Foundation, more than $200,000 each from the City of Greensboro and Guilford County, and $148,152 from the U.S. Department of Interior through the National Park Service Agency's Save America's Treasures program in 2005.

In fall 2007, Sit-in Movement, Inc. requested an additional $1.5 million from the City of Greensboro; the request was rejected. Greensboro residents twice voted down bond referendums to provide money for the project.

In 2013, the city agreed to a $1.5 million loan, with the condition that an amount equal to money raised "outside the normal course of business" by the museum from September 2013 to July 2015 would be forgiven. A June 24, 2016 memo from City Manager Jim Westmoreland and Mayor Nancy Vaughn said the museum raised $612,510 and owed $933,155, with the first $145,000 payment due June 30, and the remainder by February 2018. The museum claimed it owed $281,805. On August 1, the city council voted not to forgive $800,000 of the debt; using the museum building as collateral was an option. Two weeks later, the city council gave the museum until February 2018 to raise more money, with an amount equal to money raised to be subtracted from the debt. After making a profit in 2016, the museum announced in 2018 its debt was retired.

Fundraising and opening
As the 50th anniversary of the sit-ins grew closer, efforts increased to complete the project.  Over $9 million in donations and grants were raised.  In addition, the museum qualified for historic preservation tax credits, which were sold for $14 million. Work on the project proceeded and was completed in time for the 50th-anniversary opening.

The ICRCM opened on February 1, 2010, on the 50th anniversary of the original sit-in, with a ribbon-cutting ceremony. A religious invocation was spoken by Rev. Jesse Jackson Jr. The three surviving members of the Greensboro Four (McCain, McNeil, and Khazan) were guests of honor. Assistant Attorney Thomas Perez represented the White House. Speakers included Perez, U.S. Senator Kay Hagan and N.C. Governor Beverly Perdue.

Annual events
Since 2007 the museum organization has held an annual Black and White Ball. The 2010 theme was "Commemorating Five Decades of Civil Rights Activism." The 2011 theme was "Make a Change, Make a Difference." The 2013 theme was "Celebrating Our Victories as We Honor Our Past."

Awards
The museum organization awards an Alston-Jones International Civil and Human Rights Award. The award is given to someone whose life's work has contributed to the expansion of civil and human rights. This is the museum's highest citation. The author Maya Angelou was the winner in 1998.

The 2013 Alston-Jones award was presented to Dr. Johnnnetta Betsch Cole, director of the Smithsonian Institution's National Museum of African Art. Dr. Cole is a distinguished educator, cultural anthropologist and humanitarian. She is a former president of Bennett College and of Spelman College. The Museum gave Dr. Joe Dudley Sr., co-founder of Dudley Products, the 2013 Trailblazer Award. Gladys Shipman, proprietor of Shipman Family Care, received the 2013 Unsung Hero Award. For their courageous actions in the wake of the Feb. 1, 1960 sit-in protest, ICRCM gave Sit-In Participant Awards to Roslyn Cheagle of Lynchburg, Virginia; Raphael Glover of Charlotte, North Carolina; and Mary Lou Blakeney and Andrew Dennis McBride of High Point, North Carolina.

Proposed Trump visit 
In October 2016, the museum denied a request by US presidential candidate Donald Trump's campaign to close the museum for five hours for a proposed visit by Trump.

Exhibits
Architect Charles Hartmann designed the building in an art deco style. Completed in 1929, the building in the 100 South block of Elm Street was then known as the Whelan Building because Whelan Drug Co. rented most of the space. Woolworth moved into the site in 1939. The building is part of the Downtown Greensboro Historic District.

The International Civil Rights Center and Museum was designed by Freelon Group of Durham, North Carolina, and exhibits were designed by Eisterhold Associates of Kansas City, Missouri. It has  of exhibit space occupying the ground floor and basement, and office space on the top floor.

Docent-led and self-guided tours are available for a fee. Tours begin in the lower level where visitors are introduced to the segregated society of the 1960s through video presentations and continues with a graphic "Hall of Shame" display of the violence against civil rights protesters of all colors throughout the United States.  Visitors are introduced to the four students through a reenactment of the planning session set against the original furniture from their dorm room at A&T College in 1960.  Visitors are led into the main floor of the museum where the massive lunch counter, in the original 1960 L-shaped configuration, occupies nearly the whole width and half the length of the building.  Original signage from 1960 and dumbwaiters that delivered food from the upstairs kitchen are included, as is a reenactment of the sit-in on life-sized video screens.  Visitors are then led through a reproduction of the "Colored Entrance" at the Greensboro Rail Depot where the roles of the church, schools, politics, and courts in the civil rights movement are explored. Artifacts include a pen used to sign the Voting Rights Act of 1965, the uniform of a Tuskegee Airman native to Greensboro, and a complete Ku Klux Klan robe and hood.

Expansion plans
The museum set a goal of raising $5 million by March 31, 2022 toward the $10.25 million purchase price of an adjacent five-story building and 2.2 acres at 100 South Elm Street.  The purchase would help the museum's chances of becoming a UNESCO World Heritage Site. The city council agreed to provide $1 million on March 23, along with $250,000 a year for four years, subject to a report on the building and raising additional funds. The grant would have to be paid back if the museum sold the building. On March 29 county commissioners approved $1 million, plus $200,000 a year for five years. Sit-In Movement Inc. made the purchase on March 31.

See also
 F. W. Woolworth Building (Lexington, Kentucky)
 Sit-in movement
 State v. Katz
 Timeline of the civil rights movement

References

External links
 International Civil Rights Center and Museum homepage
 Greensboro News & Record website about the sit-in movement and the museum 
 Video from the opening ceremonies

History of Greensboro, North Carolina
Museums in Greensboro, North Carolina
History museums in North Carolina
African-American museums in North Carolina
F. W. Woolworth Company
Historic department store buildings in the United States
Art Deco architecture in North Carolina
Lunch counters
Restaurants in North Carolina
Museums established in 2010
2010 establishments in North Carolina
Civil rights movement museums
History of African-American civil rights